Hans-Georg Tutschek (born 18 September 1941) is an Austrian former footballer.

References

1941 births
Living people
Association football forwards
Austrian footballers
Bundesliga players
SK Rapid Wien players
Eintracht Frankfurt players
FC Wacker Innsbruck players
First Vienna FC players
1. Wiener Neustädter SC players
Footballers from Vienna
Austrian expatriate sportspeople in West Germany
Expatriate footballers in West Germany
Austrian expatriate footballers